Luca Cattapane was  an Italian painter active during the late 16th century in Cremona. He was a follower of the Campi family in Cremona. He painted an altarpiece now in the church of Sant'Ilario, Cremona. In the church of San Pietro al Po, Cremona, he painted figures for the fresco of the Deposition of Christ by Lattanzio Gambara; and collaborated with Cristoforo Magnani, il Somenzo, Andrea Mainardi, il Malosso and Ermenegildo da Lodi in the fresco decoration of the nave.

References

Year of birth unknown
Year of death unknown
16th-century Italian painters
Italian male painters
Italian Renaissance painters
Painters from Cremona